John Philip Henebry CBE (February 14, 1918 – September 30, 2007) was a United States Air Force major general.

Early life
He was born in Plainfield, Illinois. In 1936, he graduated from Campion High School in Prairie du Chien, Wisconsin, and then went to the University of Notre Dame in Notre Dame, Indiana, where he graduated from in 1940.

Military career
On July 30, 1940, he was appointed a flying cadet and after graduating from Air Corps basic and advanced flying schools was commissioned a second lieutenant in the Air Reserve March 14, 1941, and assigned to active duty with the 22d Bombardment Group at Langley Field in Virginia.

In May, 1941, General Henebry was appointed leader of “C” Flight and armament and chemical officer of the 39th Bombardment Squadron, 13th Bombardment Group, with which he served at various stations in the United States.

World War II
In August, 1942, he went to the Southwest Pacific theater as commander of the 13th Bomb Squadron, and soon thereafter assumed command of the 90th Attack Squadron there. Flying North American B-25 Mitchell bombers, he helped plan attacks utilizing skip bombing and took part in the Battle of the Bismarck Sea, where he attacked a damaged Japanese destroyer and two freighters in low-level runs. On November 2, 1943, he was shot down after leading a major air attack on the Japanese stronghold of Rabaul, but was rescued by a U.S. Navy PT boat, after ditching off the coast of the island of Kiriwina. He later served as operations officer and commander of the 3d Bombardment Group in that theater, and in January, 1945, assumed command of the 360th Air Service Group of the Far East Air Force. He flew a total of 219 missions during the war and was present aboard the battleship  in Tokyo Bay when the Japanese surrendered on September 2, 1945.

Post war
Henebry returned to the United States in October, 1945, for duty with the Air Technical Service Command at Wright Field in Ohio. He was relieved of active duty the following December to work with a pneumatic tools company in Chicago. From 1948 to 1950, he was assistant utility sales manager for a coal company in Chicago.

He was recalled to active duty on August 14, 1950, and appointed commanding general of the 437th Troop Carrier Wing (Medium), which he later took to Korea. In January, 1951, he assumed command of the 315th Air Division (Combat Cargo) in Korea and took part in Operation Courageous. Henebry was hospitalized in Tachikawa, Japan, in February, 1952. He returned to the United States for further hospitalization at Walter Reed Army Medical Center, until his release in June, 1952.

Henebry continued to serve in the Air Force Reserve, including duty with the Air Staff, Headquarters U.S. Air Force, Washington, D.C., in connection with Air Force Reserve Policy. He also served as president of the Air Force Association in 1956-1957. Among his varied business concerns, he was the founder and president of Skymotive Aviation Management Corporation, an airline service company with offices at O’Hare International Airport in Chicago. He remained in the Air Force Reserve until 1976, retiring at the rank of major general.

Later life
Henebry and wife Mary had two sons and three daughters, and several grand and great-grandchildren. His wife predeceased him on 2005.

After his retirement from the Air Force, Henebry and his family lived in Winnetka, Illinois. He died in Evanston, Illinois on September 30, 2007, at the age of 89. He was buried at Bement Cemetery in Bement, Illinois.

Awards and decorations
His awards include:

Published works
 Henebry, John, The Grim Reaper At Work in the Pacific Theater: The Third Attack Group of the U.S. Fifth Air Force, 2002.

References

External links
 The Death of General John Henebry

1918 births
2007 deaths
United States Air Force generals
United States Army Air Forces bomber pilots of World War II
United States Air Force personnel of the Korean War
People from Plainfield, Illinois
People from Winnetka, Illinois
Military personnel from Illinois
Aviators from Illinois
University of Notre Dame alumni
Shot-down aviators
Recipients of the Distinguished Service Cross (United States)
Recipients of the Distinguished Service Medal (US Army)
Recipients of the Silver Star
Recipients of the Legion of Merit
Recipients of the Distinguished Flying Cross (United States)
Recipients of the Air Medal
Commanders of the Order of the British Empire
Recipients of the Order of Military Merit (Korea)
United States Air Force reservists
Burials in Illinois